Hanley William is a village in Worcestershire, England.

It is part of Hanley civil parish.

Hanley William was in the upper division of Doddingtree Hundred.

Hanley William Air Strip
There is a small, private airfield with a single 600-metre-long grass runway, called the Hanley William Air Strip.

References

External links 
 

Airports in the West Midlands (region)
Transport in Worcestershire
Villages in Worcestershire